Sarah Deborah Champion (born 10 July 1969) is a British Labour Party politician who has served as the Member of Parliament (MP) for Rotherham since 2012.

Champion studied Psychology at Sheffield University. Before entering Parliament, she ran art workshops and was employed as the Chief Executive of a children's hospice in Rotherham. Champion was first elected to Parliament at the 2012 by-election.

Champion was appointed by Jeremy Corbyn as Shadow Minister for Preventing Abuse in September 2015, but resigned in June 2016, following a vote of no confidence in Corbyn. However, she returned to the frontbench in July 2016. In October 2016, she was promoted to the Shadow Cabinet as Shadow Secretary of State for Women and Equalities. In August 2017, Champion resigned from her post following criticism of an opinion piece she wrote for The Sun that discussed what she termed the problem of white girls being raped and exploited by British Pakistani men, and which fellow Labour MP Naz Shah described as "incendiary and irresponsible".

She remains in the House of Commons as a backbencher.

Early life
Champion was born in Maldon, Essex. She attended Prince William School in Oundle, then graduated with a BA degree in psychology from the University of Sheffield in 1991.

Career
After working as a volunteer at Sheffield's St Luke's Hospice and running art workshops at the city's Abbeydale Road Secondary School she gained full-time employment, running Rotherham Arts Centre from 1992 to 1994. Champion then worked as an Arts Development Officer for Ashfield District Council. She ran the Chinese Arts Centre in Manchester from 1996 to 2008, and was the Chief Executive of the Bluebell Wood Children's Hospice in North Anston, Rotherham from 2008 to 2012.

In November 2012 she was selected to be Labour's candidate for the upcoming Rotherham by-election, which was triggered by the resignation of the constituency's MP, Denis MacShane. Champion was chosen to stand for Parliament from a shortlist chosen by the party. She was elected as MP for Rotherham on 29 November with 9,866 votes (a 46.25% overall share of the vote). Jane Collins of the UK Independence Party was second with 4,648 votes (21.79%), achieving that party's best result in a by-election. Labour achieved a majority of 5,218 (24.46%), an increase in terms of percentage from Rotherham's 2010 general election result, but a decrease in the actual number of votes cast. Champion is Rotherham's first female MP.

In an interview with BBC Radio Sheffield on 30 November 2012, Champion said that she does not regard herself as being a career politician: "There are some people who from the moment they were born wanted to be a politician. Whereas for me, since I started working I've always been working with the community and I want to carry on doing that."

In a 2014 BBC interview, Champion admitted that she rarely attends Prime Minister's Questions.

On 7 May 2015, Champion was re-elected as the Member of Parliament for Rotherham with a 52.5% share of the vote. She secured 19,860 votes, increasing her majority by over 3,000. She was one of 36 Labour MPs to nominate Jeremy Corbyn as a candidate in the Labour leadership election of 2015.

In September 2017, the political commentator Iain Dale placed Champion at Number 92 on his list of the '100 most influential people on the Left'.

In November 2017, a fly-on-the-wall BBC documentary Labour: The Summer that Changed Everything made during the 2017 general election campaign was shown, with Champion as one of four MPs critical of Jeremy Corbyn's leadership who were followed for six weeks. The documentary showed Champion stating "I don't believe you can be a leader if nobody's following you", and the MPs' surprise at the election result. Champion discussed the psychological stresses of the campaign and being at parliament, and that she did not feel tough enough to go back to parliament the day after the result.

In the 2019 general election, Champion was re-elected as MP for Rotherham with a majority of 3,121.

Parliament
Champion was formerly a member of the Transport Select Committee, Parliamentary Private Secretary to Shadow Education Secretary Tristram Hunt, Chair of the All-party parliamentary group (APPG) on Victims and Witnesses, Chair of the All-party Parliamentary Group on Choice at the End of Life, and Co-chair All-party Parliamentary Health Group. Since 2020 she is Chair of the International Development Committee. Champion has chaired the All-party Parliamentary Group on Street Children since November 2021.

Champion was appointed Shadow Minister for 'preventing abuse and domestic violence' in 2015. She resigned from this position on 28 June 2016, in the wake of criticism of Jeremy Corbyn's approach towards the EU referendum following a vote to leave the EU.

Child sexual exploitation
In November 2013, it was announced that Champion, in partnership with children's charity Barnardos, would lead a cross-party inquiry to investigate the effectiveness of the Sexual Offences Act 2003 in tackling child sexual exploitation and trafficking within the UK.

Champion conducted an inquiry with Barnardo's in 2013 to investigate how effectively children were, at that time, protected by the law from sexual exploitation. Later, in July 2014, and as a result of her inquiry, Champion managed to make an amendment to the Criminal Justice and Courts Bill that allowed a person caught arranging to meet a child for sex to be convicted straight away. Previously, the person had to be caught twice.

In January 2016, Champion launched a campaign called Dare2Care that focuses on preventing child abuse and the normalisation of violence in young people's relationships The campaign has launched a website, putting tools and resources for young people, parents and professionals in one place. These are intended to help better inform people on how to tackle child abuse and relationship violence. Later in March she publicly criticised the Prime Minister over a failure to carry out pledges made the previous year in tackling with child abuse. Champion criticised the lack of progress over a national child abuse task force and a whistleblowing portal that had no 'taskforce to blow to' as well as the failure to begin a consultation on extending the offence of wilful neglect to children's social care, education and councils.

Rotherham child sexual exploitation scandal

In response to the Jay Report, released in August 2014, which found 1,400 victims of child sexual exploitation in Rotherham between 1997 and 2013, Champion applauded the council for apologising and accepting the report. The following week Champion put a short question to the Home Secretary, saying she was angry, and asked for necessary resources to solve the problems.

In October 2014, Champion secured additional funding to appoint Jayne Senior, a specialist in child sexual exploitation, to support the 1,400 victims of child abuse in Rotherham.

In November 2014, Champion asked the Prime Minister to support Rotherham's victims and to ensure that procedures are in place to prevent such widespread abuse happening again. The Prime Minister replied in part that the Home Office was leading "this important effort" in getting departments to work together.

In 2015, three Rotherham Labour MPs, Kevin Barron, Champion and John Healey, started a defamation legal action against UKIP MEP Jane Collins after Collins falsely alleged in a UKIP conference speech that the three MPs knew about child exploitation in Rotherham but did not intervene, and in February 2017 the MPs were awarded £54,000 each in damages.

Gender pay equality
In December 2014, Champion took a Ten Minute Rule Bill to Parliament, asking for the mandatory publishing of figures of the pay gap between men and women in any company of over 250 employees. The Bill was overwhelmingly supported by MPs, with 258 voting in support and just 8 voting against.

In July 2015 the Prime Minister, David Cameron, announced that the Government would be adopting the measures put forward in Champion's Bill.

Brexit
Champion repeatedly voted against Theresa May's Brexit deal. On 16 July 2019, Champion stated: "If my party comes out as a remain party rather than trying to find a deal or rather than trying to exit, I can't support that, it goes against democracy". She said she would rather support a "no-deal Brexit"  than remain in the EU, as she believed Labour had to deliver the result of the 2016 referendum.

Shadow Minister for Preventing Abuse
Champion was appointed as Shadow Minister for Preventing Abuse by Jeremy Corbyn in September 2015.

In June 2016, Champion resigned as shadow Home Office minister focusing on women, equality and domestic violence after Labour MPs passed a motion of no confidence in Jeremy Corbyn. However, the next month she returned to the frontbench in the same post.

In September 2016, it became known that Champion had been cautioned by police in 2007 after a violent altercation with her husband while they were about to divorce. Champion admitted she had "lost control" and said: "I'm not proud of what happened and I accept I was in the wrong but I have nothing to hide. I lost control after being provoked for years and for that I am sorry but I felt extremely vulnerable at that moment".

Shadow Minister for Women and Equalities
In October 2016, the leader of the Labour Party Jeremy Corbyn appointed Champion to the role of Shadow Minister for Women and Equalities. In November 2016, Champion launched Dare2Care, a National Action Plan for Preventing Child Abuse and Violence in Teenage Relationships. Among Champion's key recommendations is the compulsory introduction of resilience and relationships education for all children from Key Stage One.

In August 2017, on BBC Radio 4's Today programme she said that "more people are afraid to be called a racist than they are afraid to be wrong about calling out child abuse". Her statements were followed by an opinion piece for The Sun titled "British Pakistani men ARE raping and exploiting white girls ... and it's time we faced up to it". The article went on to suggest that "Britain has a problem with British Pakistani men raping and exploiting white girls". Fellow Labour MP Naz Shah criticised Champion's statements, describing the headline as incendiary and irresponsible, and claiming that 90% of child sexual abusers were white men.

A few days later, Champion distanced herself from The Sun article, which she said should "not have gone out in my name", stating that the beginning of the article had been altered by the newspaper's staff resulting in the piece being "stripped of nuance". The newspaper said the article's final form had been approved by her team, and later produced an email from one of her aides confirming she was actually "thrilled" by the article. Champion resigned from her post on 16 August 2017.

Backbenches 
She was re-elected with a reduced majority at the 2019 general election.

In 2021 she co-sponsored the Marriage and Civil Partnership (Minimum Age) Bill.

Personal life
In 1999 Champion married Graham Hoyland, a BBC producer and explorer. The couple divorced in 2007.

Champion spends her free time travelling the UK coast and exploring the continents. She has reportedly visited 62 countries in her life.

Notes

References

External links

Sarah Champion at Labour.org.uk

Dare2Care.org.uk

|-

1969 births
Living people
21st-century British women politicians
Alumni of the University of Sheffield
Female members of the Parliament of the United Kingdom for English constituencies
Labour Party (UK) MPs for English constituencies
UK MPs 2010–2015
UK MPs 2015–2017
UK MPs 2017–2019
UK MPs 2019–present
21st-century English women
21st-century English people